Kirill Garrievich Petrenko (born 11 February 1972) is a Russian-Austrian conductor. He is chief conductor of the Berlin Philharmonic.

Early life
Petrenko was born in Omsk, Russian SFSR, Soviet Union, to a violinist father and musicologist mother. He is of Jewish descent. His father was born in Lviv (now in Ukraine). Petrenko studied piano as a youth, and made his public debut as a pianist at age 11. At age 18, he and his family emigrated to Austria, where his father played in the Symphony Orchestra Vorarlberg. Petrenko studied music at the Vorarlberger Landeskonservatorium in Feldkirch, Vorarlberg, graduating with honours in piano studies. He continued his musical studies in Vienna at the University of Music and Performing Arts, Vienna, where his teachers included Uroš Lajovic. His other conducting teachers and mentors have included Myung-Whun Chung, Edward Downes, Péter Eötvös, Ferdinand Leitner, Roberto Carnevale and Semyon Bychkov.

Career
Petrenko made his conducting debut in opera in 1995 in Vorarlberg with a production of Britten's Let's Make an Opera.  He was a Kapellmeister at the Vienna Volksoper from 1997 to 1999. From 1999 to 2002, he was Generalmusikdirektor (GMD) of the Südthüringisches Staatstheater, Das Meininger Theater (Meiningen, Germany), where his work included conducting the four stage works of Wagner's Der Ring des Nibelungen (Ring Cycle) in 2001 on four consecutive days, his first professional conducting engagement with the operas of Wagner. He conducted Wagner's complete Ring Cycle at the Bayreuth Festival in 2013, 2014, and 2015.

Petrenko was GMD of the Komische Oper Berlin from 2002 to 2007. During this period, he made his debut with the Bavarian State Opera in 2003, and he returned to the Munich company in 2009 for a production of Jenůfa. In October 2010, the Bavarian State Opera announced the appointment of Petrenko as its next GMD, starting in 2013. In October 2015, his contract as GMD of the Bavarian State Opera, previously set through 2018, was extended through the 2020–2021 season, although for the final year of his contract, he is scheduled to appear as a guest conductor.

Petrenko first guest-conducted the Berlin Philharmonic in 2006, and returned for guest engagements in 2009 and 2012. He had been scheduled for a December 2014 guest appearance with the orchestra, but withdrew at short notice because of injury. In June 2015, the Berlin Philharmonic announced the election of Petrenko as its next chief conductor. This appointment is Petrenko's first appointment to a chief conductorship of a symphony orchestra which is not affiliated with an opera company. The official start of his Berlin Philharmonic tenure was not indicated at the time of the election, except for a comment by then-Berlin Philharmonic intendant Martin Hoffmann that "We are assuming that it will happen soon after 2018". In October 2015, the orchestra announced that Petrenko was formally to commence his contract as chief conductor of the Berlin Philharmonic in the 2019–2020 season, with scheduled guest appearances in the seasons prior to 2019–2020. In October 2016, the Berlin Philharmonic formally announced that Petrenko was to officially to start his tenure as the orchestra's chief conductor on 19 August 2019.

During the 2014 Crimean crisis, Petrenko called for a solution that would respect Ukraine's sovereignty. In March 2020, Monika Grütters, the current Federal Government Commissioner for Culture and the Media in Germany, and Petrenko assumed patronage of the Musiker-Nothilfe, a patronage fund for freelance musicians affected by the COVID-19 pandemic. In February 2022, Petrenko condemned Russia's invasion of Ukraine as a "knife in the back of the entire peaceful world".

References

External links
 Michael Lewin Artists Management German-language agency page on Kirill Petrenko
 Andrew Powell, 'Petrenko Hosts Petrenko'.  Musical America 22 April 2016
 Berlin Philharmonic Orchestra, German-language biography of Kirill Petrenko

Austrian conductors (music)
Music directors (opera)
1972 births
Living people
Russian people of Jewish descent
Jewish classical musicians
Russian people of Ukrainian descent
Russian emigrants to Austria
University of Music and Performing Arts Vienna alumni
21st-century Russian conductors (music)
Russian male conductors (music)
21st-century Russian male musicians
Russian activists against the 2022 Russian invasion of Ukraine